United Medical and Dental College (UMDC) is a medical college located in Karachi, Pakistan. The college gives admission to 100 Bachelor of Medicine, Bachelor of Surgery & Medicine students each year. It has three affiliated hospitals located at different location in the city. UMDC is enrolling its ninth Batch of students in 2020. UMDC has been ranked amongst the top ten medical colleges in Pakistan and in the top two in Sindh by the Pakistan Medical Commission (PMC).

The college is affiliated with Jinnah Sindh Medical University and is recognized by the Pakistan Medical and Dental Council and Ministry of Health, Pakistan Ministry of Health. The college is listed in the International Medical Education Directory (IMED) and World Directory of Medical Schools (WDOMS).

Teaching affiliates
 Creek General Hospital
 United Hospital 
 A.O Hospital

Departments
UMDC includes the following departments:
 Department of Anatomy
Department of Physiology
 Department of Biochemistry
 Department of Pharmacology
 Department of Pathology
 Department of Community & Public Health Sciences
 Department of Forensic Medicine & Toxicology
 Department of Medicine
 Department of Surgery
 Department of Obstetrics and Gynecology
 Department of ENT
 Department of Ophthalmology
 Department of Pediatrics
 Department of Psychiatry
 Department of Medical Education

Faculty 
The college has a very renowned faculty with professors trained from all around the world including two Ivy League universities, i.e. University of Pennsylvania and Harvard University.

Creek General Hospital 
Creek general Hospital is a non-profit 500 bed teaching hospital of UMDC, it has over 14 specialties and has approximately 600-800 patients that visit the hospital on a daily basis. Services of laboratory, radiology, ultrasound, echocardiography, emergency room, ICUs, neonatal ICU, inpatient stay and outpatient services are totally free of cost.

See also
List of schools of medicine in Pakistan

References

External links

Universities and colleges in Karachi
Dental schools in Pakistan
Medical colleges in Sindh